Rododafni (Greek: Ροδοδάφνη, before 1928: Μουρλά - Mourla) is a town in northern Achaea, Greece. It is located on the Gulf of Corinth, 4 km northwest of Aigio and 28 km east of Patras. Rododafni had a population of 2,564 in 2011. It was the seat of the municipality of Sympoliteia, which is a municipal unit of the municipality Aigialeia since 2011. The Greek National Road 8A (Athens - Corinth - Patras) and the railway Corinth - Patras pass through the town. Rododafni's beach and the area along the coast is called Akoli, while the settlement lying in between is called Avythos.

Population

Sporting clubs

Anagennisi/Aias Sympoliteias - football (soccer)

External links
 Rododafni on GTP Travel Pages

See also

List of settlements in Achaea

References

Aigialeia
Populated places in Achaea